Victoria Park railway station is located on the Mernda and Hurstbridge lines in Victoria, Australia. It serves the north-eastern Melbourne suburb of Abbotsford, and it opened on 8 May 1888 as Collingwood. It was renamed Victoria Park on 1 May 1909.

A former goods yard is located adjacent to Platform 1, whilst a stabling siding, capable of holding two stabled trains, is located at the Down (northern) end of the station.

History

Victoria Park station opened on 8 May 1888 and, until 1901, the station was the terminus of the Collingwood to Heidelberg railway line. Until a direct connection with the Melbourne CBD was opened in 1901 between Princes Bridge and Collingwood Town Hall, the only connection to the city centre was via the indirect Inner Circle line.

On 21 March 1959, the station platforms were damaged by a fire that occurred at a nearby timber yard.

In 1981, the present pebbledash station buildings were provided, with the original timber pylons that supported the former buildings removed soon after.

The station is adjacent to Victoria Park, the former home of the Collingwood Football Club between 1892 and 1999. Large numbers of people used Victoria Park station to travel to and from AFL matches played at the stadium.

Announced as part of a $21.9 million package in the 2022/23 Victorian State Budget, Victoria Park, alongside other stations, will receive accessibility upgrades, the installation of CCTV and platform shelters. The development process will begin in late 2022 or 2023, with a timeline for the upgrades to be released once construction has begun.

Platforms and services

Victoria Park has two side platforms. It is serviced by Metro Trains' Mernda and Hurstbridge line services.

Platform 1:
  all stations services to Flinders Street
  all stations services to Flinders Street

Platform 2:
  all stations services to Mernda
  all stations and limited express services to Macleod, Greensborough, Eltham and Hurstbridge

Transport links

Kinetic Melbourne operates fifteen routes via Victoria Park station, under contract to Public Transport Victoria:
 : Melbourne CBD (Queen Street) – Bulleen
 : Yarra Bend Park – University of Melbourne
 : Melbourne CBD (Queen Street) – Westfield Doncaster
 : Elsternwick station – Clifton Hill
 : Melbourne CBD (Lonsdale Street) – Box Hill station
 : Melbourne CBD (Queen Street) – Ringwood North
 : Melbourne CBD (Lonsdale Street) – Westfield Doncaster
 : Melbourne CBD (Lonsdale Street) – The Pines Shopping Centre (peak-hour only)
 : Melbourne CBD (Queen Street) – Donvale
 : Melbourne CBD (Lonsdale Street) – Deep Creek Reserve (Doncaster East)
 : Melbourne CBD (Queen Street) – La Trobe University Bundoora Campus
  : Melbourne CBD (Lonsdale Street) – The Pines Shopping Centre
  : Melbourne CBD (Lonsdale Street) – Warrandyte
  : Melbourne CBD (Lonsdale Street) – Mitcham station
  : Melbourne CBD (Lonsdale Street) – The Pines Shopping Centre (peak-hour only)

McKenzie's Tourist Services operates one route via Victoria Park station, under contract to Public Transport Victoria:
 : Eildon – Southern Cross station

References

External links
 Melway map at street-directory.com.au

Railway stations in Melbourne
Railway stations in Australia opened in 1888
Railway stations in the City of Yarra